The 2013 International German Open (also known as the bet–at–home Open – German Tennis Championships 2013 for sponsorship reasons) was a men's tennis tournament played on outdoor red clay courts. It was the 107th edition of the event known that year as the International German Open and was part of the ATP World Tour 500 series of the 2013 ATP World Tour. It took place at the Am Rothenbaum in Hamburg, Germany, from 14 July through 22 July 2013. Twelfth-seeded Fabio Fognini won the singles title.

Points and prize money

Points distribution

Prize money

Singles main draw entrants

Seeds 

 1 Rankings are as of July 8, 2013

Other entrants 
The following players received wildcards into the singles main draw:
  Roger Federer
  Julian Reister
  Jan-Lennard Struff
  Alexander Zverev

The following players received entry from the qualifying draw:
  Federico Delbonis
  Andrey Golubev
  Jan Hájek
  Blaž Kavčič
  Łukasz Kubot
  Diego Sebastián Schwartzman

Withdrawals
Before the tournament
  Pablo Cuevas
  Jürgen Melzer
  Jarkko Nieminen
  Gilles Simon
  Bernard Tomic

Retirements
  Jerzy Janowicz (right arm injury)

Doubles main draw entrants

Seeds 

 Rankings are as of July 8, 2013

Other entrants 
The following pairs received wildcards into the doubles main draw:
  Andre Begemann /  Martin Emmrich
  Daniel Brands /  Christopher Kas

Withdrawals
During the tournament
  David Marrero (right calf injury)
  Benoît Paire (elbow injury)

Finals

Singles 

  Fabio Fognini defeated  Federico Delbonis, 4–6, 7–6(10–8), 6–2

Doubles 

  Mariusz Fyrstenberg /  Marcin Matkowski defeated  Alexander Peya /  Bruno Soares, 3–6, 6–1, [10–8]

References

External links 
  
   
 Association of Tennis Professionals (ATP) tournament profile

 
International German Open
Hamburg European Open
International German Open
July 2013 sports events in Germany